Lucila Vianna da Silva (born 7 March 1976) is a Brazilian handball player. She has represented the Brazilian national team in three Olympics. She participated at the 2000 Summer Olympics in Sydney, at the 2004 Summer Olympics in Athens and at the 2008 Summer Olympics in China.

References

1976 births
Living people
Sportspeople from Rio de Janeiro (city)
Brazilian female handball players
Handball players at the 2000 Summer Olympics
Handball players at the 2004 Summer Olympics
Handball players at the 2008 Summer Olympics
Olympic handball players of Brazil
Handball players at the 2007 Pan American Games
Pan American Games medalists in handball
Pan American Games gold medalists for Brazil
Medalists at the 2007 Pan American Games
21st-century Brazilian women